Taylor Marie Behl (October 13, 1987 – September 6, 2005) was a 17-year-old college freshman from Vienna, Virginia. She moved to Richmond, Virginia, in August 2005 to attend Virginia Commonwealth University. About two weeks later on Labor Day, September 5, 2005, Behl disappeared. Acting on a tip one month later, VCU police located her remains at a rural area in Mathews County, Virginia. The case was an Internet cause célèbre.

Case
In the early morning of Saturday, September 17, 2005, Behl's car was found about a mile and a half from the VCU Campus. A tracking dog led police to Jesse Schultz, 22, who lived in the area where Behl's car was found; Schultz was eventually cleared.
Police also questioned a former boyfriend of Behl with whom she had dinner on September 5, and other acquaintances.

Another of the last individuals to have seen Behl alive was Benjamin Fawley, a 38-year-old amateur photographer and self-described "Goth/skater from the 1980s."  Fawley's alibi could not be confirmed, and after executing a search warrant police arrested him on September 23 for 16 counts of child pornography.

A surveillance video showed Behl and Fawley leaving Behl's dormitory together on the night she disappeared.  According to police, Fawley told them Behl died accidentally during a consensual sex act (likely erotic asphyxiation) with him in her car at Mathews County, Virginia. He claimed he then panicked and dumped her unburied body in a ravine.

Behl's mother Janet Pelasara called Fawley "a big, fat liar" and claimed that Behl had sex "once out of curiosity" with Fawley in April 2005, "and then didn't want anything to do with him." In August 2006, Fawley's Alford plea to second degree murder was accepted and he was sentenced to thirty years in prison.

Use of internet
In September 2007, Chuck Cohen, a first sergeant with the Indiana State Police, told a class of 21 law enforcement agencies studying "how criminals often leave an online trail at social networking sites such as MySpace and Facebook" that the Taylor Behl case marked one of the first times that police narrowed down their suspect pool using a MySpace friends list. Cohen said that Fawley's Internet footprint eventually led police to Behl's body.

See also
List of kidnappings
List of solved missing person cases

References

External links
Taylor Behl's LiveJournal

2000s missing person cases
2005 in Virginia
2005 murders in the United States
Deaths by person in Virginia
Formerly missing people
History of women in Virginia
Missing person cases in Virginia
People who entered an Alford plea
September 2005 events in the United States
Virginia Commonwealth University